Alicia Lemke (3 February 1987 – 9 August 2015) was an American singer who released her music as Alice and the Glass Lake.

Biography
Lemke was born in Madison, Wisconsin to Bradley and Gale Lemke. She attended Shorewood Hills Elementary School, Blessed Sacramant School, and West High School. She appeared in Children's Theatre of Madison productions numerous times. After graduating from West, Alicia went to school at Swarthmore College in Pennsylvania. She was double majoring in biology and musical theater. She eventually pursued the arts route, and she attended the Berklee College of Music in Boston.

She then moved to New York, doing gigs around clubs in the city. It was during that time that she developed her voice as a musician. People in New York and Los Angeles urged her to change her name to avoid confusion with Alicia Keys, so she chose the name Alice and the Glass Lake, which she chose as an ode to a lake in northern Wisconsin at which her family had a cabin. On July 9, 2009, Lemke created a YouTube channel where she would upload videos of covers and original compositions.

On June 20, 2012, Matt Harding released "Where the Hell is Matt? 2012". The video features Matt and many others dancing in 71 locations, comprising 55 countries and 11 US states. The video uses the song "Trip the Light", composed by Garry Schyman and sung by Alicia Lemke.

In 2013, she opened for Fleetwood Mac. That year, she had also played at the Bonnaroo Music and Arts Festival in Tennessee. In August 2013, she released her first EP of electronic dream pop. In November, she was labeled as a rising star or artist to watch by Live Fast Magazine and Pigeons & People. In December of that year, she was diagnosed with a rare form of leukemia while on vacation in France.

Death and posthumous releases
She died on August 9, 2015 from leukemia. She had been sending notes to her producer about her then-upcoming album Chimaera up to two days before her death. Her debut album, Chimaera, was posthumously released on November 18, 2016. CrypticRock gave it five stars out of five, and they labeled it as one of its top five pop rock albums of 2016, saying "Full of hope, pain, and angelic vocals, this is a must listen and surely secures this talented artist’s legacy."

Kiesza, whom Lemke met in college and was close friends with, wrote the song "Dearly Beloved" in Lemke's memory. The song was released on January 6, 2017.

She posthumously appeared in Eminem's 2017 album, Revival in the title track, "Revival (Interlude)". The vocals were taken from an unreleased song submitted to Eminem in 2012.

Two of her songs appeared in the 2017 Canadian film, Suck It Up. Lemke's song "Luminous" appeared in the sixth episode of the fourth season of the television series Awkward, the third episode of the fourth season of Station 19, and the third episode of the first season of Billions.

Discography

Studio albums
Chimaera (2015)

Extended plays
Shades of Motion (2010)
Imaginary (2011)
The Evolution EP (2013)

Appearances
 Eminem: ''Revival (2017)

References

External links

1987 births
2015 deaths
Musicians from Madison, Wisconsin
Swarthmore College alumni
Berklee College of Music alumni
Singers from Wisconsin
Deaths from leukemia